The 2005 Mnet KM Music Video Festival (MKMF) was the seventh of the annual music awards in Seoul, South Korea, that took place on November 27, 2005, at the Olympic Gymnastics Arena.

Shin Dong-yup and Kim Ah-joong hosted the 2005 edition of the awards ceremony. Boy band TVXQ was the most nominated act of the night with three nominations, where they won the Most Popular Music Video daesang for "Rising Sun".

Background
The award ceremony was held for the seventh consecutive time, and the grand awards (or daesang) were still the Best Popular Music Video and Music Video of the Year. For the first time, the event took place at the Olympic Gymnastics Arena with Shin Dong-yup as a returning host and Kim Ah-joong as his co-host.

This marked was the last year that the two daesang awards were given, lasting up to seven years. The categories for Best New Male and Female Artist were joined as Best New Artist, while Music Video Acting award was added this year. A total of 11 Special Awards were handed, on the other hand, including the yearly Overseas Viewers' Award.

There were other notable guests on the event besides the presenters and performers, including the silhouette dancer for BoA's performance Hyoyeon, who would later debut as a member of Girls' Generation. Six Mnet characters 보, 쳇, 섭리, 병, 구, and 371 also made appearances.

After BoA's performance of "Girls on Top", she appeared to have fainted while coming down from the stage and was immediately carried away on the back of her manager to her car. Her agency reported that she was just exhausted after the 9-minute dance and having practiced without rest the day before. She later returned without concern to accept her award for Best Female Artist.

Criteria
The following criteria for winners include:

Winners and nominees
Winners are listed first and highlighted in boldface.

Special awards
 YEPP Digital Popularity Award: MC Mong – "Invincible"
Overseas Viewers' Award: Kangta – "Mask"
Technological Sector
Filming Award: Park Sung-il ("Splendor of Youth" by Jaurim)
Editing Award: Song Geol ("It Must Have Been In Love" by YB)
Special Effects Award: FX NINE ("My Love Song" by Clon)
Judges' Choice Award: Jo PD – "My Old Story" (나의 옛날 이야기)
Gmarket Netizen Popularity Award: Moon Hee-joon – "A Small Village Called Memories"
Planning Award: Samsung Anycall – Anymotion commercial (with Lee Hyori and Eric Mun)
 Mnet Plus Mobile Popularity Award: TVXQ – "Rising Sun"
 Mnet PD's Choice Award: S.E.S.

Multiple awards

Artist(s) with multiple nominations
The following artist(s) received two or more nominations:

Presenters and performers
The following individuals and groups, listed in order of appearance, presented awards or performed musical numbers.

Performers

Presenters

References

External links
 Mnet Asian Music Awards  official website

MAMA Awards ceremonies
Mnet Music Video Festival
Mnet Music Video Festival
Mnet Music Video Festival
Mnet Music Video Festival, 2005